Amboangibe or Amboahangibe is a town and commune in northern Madagascar. It belongs to the district of Sambava, which is a part of Sava Region. The population of the commune was estimated to be approximately 18,000 in 2001 commune census.

Primary and junior level secondary education are available in town. The majority 90% of the population are farmers.  The most important crop is vanilla, while other important products are banana and coffee.  Services provide employment for 10% of the population.

References

Populated places in Sava Region